The Interactive Encyclopedia System, or TIES, was a hypertext system developed in the University of Maryland Human-Computer Interaction Lab by Ben Shneiderman in 1983. The earliest versions of TIES ran in DOS text mode, using the cursor arrow keys for navigating through information. A later version of HyperTIES for the Sun workstation was developed by Don Hopkins using the NeWS window system, with an authoring tool based on UniPress's Gosling Emacs text editor.

HyperTIES
The TIES program has evolved into the HyperTIES commercial product, sold by the Cognetics Corporation. HyperTIES has a small feature set and has touch-screen support which makes it optimal for public displays and information kiosks. As for navigation types, only reference links are supported, which can be either text or graphics. The mouse pointer also highlights anchors when passing over them.

External links
 Hypertext Research: The Development of HyperTIES
 HyperTIES Hypermedia Browser and Emacs Authoring Tool for NeWS, overview article at Don Hopkins' website 
 Designing to facilitate browsing: A look back at the Hyperties workstation browser, by Ben Shneiderman, Catherine Plaisant, Rodrigo Botafogo, Don Hopkins, William Weiland

Hypertext
Computer-related introductions in 1983
Editing software